Cape Fear is the debut album by Canadian indie rock band Germans, released 13 February 2007 on the Arena Rock Recording Co. label.

Track listing
All songs written by Germans, except as noted:
 "Tiger Vacuum Bottle"
 "No Job"
 "Nature's Mouth"
 "I Am the Teacher"
 "So It's Out!"
 "Franchise"
 "Pogos Abenteur" (written by Bodenstandig 2000)
 "M. Bison"
 "Brown's"

References

Cape Fear
Cape Fear
Cape Fear